Gregorio Pernía (born Fernando José Gregorio Pernía Maldonado; May 7, 1970, Cúcuta, Colombia) is a Colombian actor of television.

Filmography

Television roles

References

External links 
 

1970 births
Colombian male telenovela actors
Colombian male television actors
20th-century Colombian male actors
21st-century Colombian male actors
People from Cúcuta
Living people